Hernández is a widespread Spanish patronymic surname, that became common around the 15th century. It means son of Hernán, Hernando or Fernando — the Spanish version of Germanic Ferdinand. Fernández is a very common variant of the name. Hernandes and Fernandes are their Portuguese equivalents.

The fact that the Hernández family of Spain bears a version of the French royal arms leads many to speculate that they descend from the French royal house of Valois.

Geographical distribution
As of 2014, 52.9% of all known bearers of the surname Hernández were residents of Mexico (frequency 1:25), 7.7% of the United States (1:510), 6.3% of Colombia (1:83), 5.8% of Venezuela (1:57), 4.1% of Cuba (1:30), 4.0% of Spain (1:125), 4.0% of Guatemala (1:44), 2.9% of Honduras (1:33), 2.7% of El Salvador (1:26), 1.5% of Nicaragua (1:43), 1.5% of the Philippines (1:746), 1.2% of the Dominican Republic (1:92) and 1.2% of Chile (1:158).

In Spain, the frequency of the surname was higher than national average (1:125) in the following autonomous communities:
 1. Canary Islands (1:24)
 2. Region of Murcia (1:66)
 3. Castile and León (1:67)
 4. Extremadura (1:100)

In Mexico, the frequency of the surname was higher than national average (1:25) in the following states:
 1. Hidalgo (1:10)
 2. San Luis Potosí (1:15)
 3. Tabasco (1:16)
 4. Veracruz (1:16)
 5. Chiapas (1:16)
 6. Tlaxcala (1:17)
 7. Querétaro (1:22)
 8. Oaxaca (1:22)
 9. Tamaulipas (1:23)
 10. Puebla (1:23)
 11. State of Mexico (1:25)

People with the name Hernández

Actors and television personalities
 Antonio Hernández (born 1953), Spanish film director and screenwriter
 April Lee Hernández, Puerto Rican actress
 Daniel Hernández, American rapper
 David Hernandez, Mexican-American finalist on American Idol
 Gérard Hernandez (born 1933), French actor
 Jay Hernandez, Mexican-American actor
 Juano Hernández, Puerto Rican actor
 Óscar Isaac Hernández Estrada (born 1979), Guatemalan-born American actor (known as Oscar Isaac)
 Rafael Hernández, Spanish actor
 Tom Hernández (1915–1984), Spanish American actor
 Thom Adcox-Hernandez (born 1960), American actor
 Vicky Hernández, Colombian actress

Artists
 Agustín Hernández Navarro (1924–2022), Mexican architect and sculptor
 Amalia Hernández (1917–2000), Mexican ballet choreographer
 Anaida Hernández (b. 1954), Puerto Rican sculptor, painter, installation artist, muralist, documentary director, and businesswoman
 Daniel Hernández (1856–1932), Peruvian painter
 Desiderio Hernández Xochitiotzin (1922–2007), Mexican mural painter
 Felipe Hernandez (born 1971), Colombian architect
 Francisco Hernández Tomé (died 1872), Spanish mural painter
 Gilberto Hernández Ortega (1924–1978), Dominican painter
 Gregorio Hernández (usually "Fernández"), (1576–1636), Spanish sculptor
 José Hernández (1944–2013), Spanish painter
 Judithe Hernández (born 1948), American visual artist
 Lazaro Hernandez, fashion designer
 Liz Hernández (born 1993), Mexican-born American visual artist and designer
Nestor Hernandez (1961–2006), American photographer

Musicians and composers
 Ally Brooke Hernandez, American singer, dancer, and member of the girl group Fifth Harmony
 Ariel Hernández, American singer in pop group No Mercy
 Aurelio Hernández (born 1967), Cuban-born American musician, better known as "Aurelio Voltaire"
 Cenobio Hernandez, Mexican-American composer
 Daniel Hernandez, American rapper of Puerto Rican and Mexican descent (known as 6ix9ine)
 Eduardo Hernández Moncada (1899–1995), Mexican composer, pianist, and conductor
 Gabriel Hernández, American singer in American pop band No Mercy
 Gisela Hernández (1912–1971), Cuban composer
 Horacio Hernandez, Cuban drummer
 José Ledesma Hernández, musician, composer, and educator
 Julio Alberto Hernández (1900–1999), Dominican composer
 Larry Hernández, Mexican singer
 Marcos Hernandez (born 1982), American singer
 Myriam Hernández, Chilean singer
 Oscar Hernández (born 1954), Puerto Rican salsa music composer
 Patrick Hernandez (born 1949), French singer
 Peter Hernández, American singer of Puerto Rican-Filipino descent (known as Bruno Mars)
 Priscilla Hernández, Spanish singer-songwriter
 Rafael Hernández Marín (1892–1965), Puerto Rican composer
 Saúl Hernández (born 1964), Mexican singer and guitarist

Politicians
 Alma Hernandez, American politician
 Benigno C. Hernández (1862–1954), American politician
 Edward P. Hernandez, American politician
 Eugenio Hernández Flores, Mexican politician
 Federico Hernández Denton (born 1944), Chief Justice of the Supreme Court of Puerto Rico
 Ismael Hernández (born 1964), Governor of Durango, Mexico
 José María Hernández (1959–2015), Spanish politician
 Joseph Marion Hernández (1793–1857), American politician, first representative with Spanish ancestry to have served in the U.S. Congress
 Kenneth McClintock Hernández, Puerto Rican politician
 Maximiliano Hernández Martínez, President of El Salvador 
 Miguel Hernández Agosto (1927–2016), Puerto Rican senator
 Oscar Hernandez, mayor of Bell, California
 Rafael Hernández Colón (1936–2019), Governor of Puerto Rico
 Rafael Hernández Ochoa (1915–1990), Mexican politician
 Ramil Hernandez, Filipino politician 
 Roger Hernandez, American politician, California Assembly member, 48th District

Sports
 Hernandez (wrestler) (born 1973), American wrestler
 Aaron Hernandez (19892017), American football player
 Abel Hernández, Uruguayan football player
 Adriana Hernández (born 2003), Mexican rhythmic gymnast
 Aitor Hernández (born 1982), Spanish cyclist
 Alejandro Hernández, Mexican tennis player
 Amelia Hernández (born 1971), Venezuelan chess player and surgeon
 Ana Hernández, Cuban basketball player
 Anaysi Hernández (born 1981), Cuban judoka
 Anderson Hernández, Dominican baseball player
 Andony Hernández, Mexican football player
 Andris Hernández, Venezuelan track and road cyclist 
 Ángel Hernández, Spanish long jumper
 Angel Hernandez, Cuban-American baseball umpire
 Ariel Hernández (born 1972), Cuban boxer
 Bernardo Hernández (born 1942), Mexican footballer
 Carlos Hernández, Salvadoran-American boxer
 Carlos Hernández (catcher) (born 1967), Venezuelan baseball catcher
 Carlos Hernández (infielder) (born 1975), Venezuelan baseball player
 Carlos Hernández (pitcher, born 1980), Venezuelan baseball pitcher
 Carlos Hernández (pitcher, born 1997), Venezuelan baseball pitcher
 Carlos Alexis Hernández, Cuban weightlifter
 Carlos Hernández Valverde, Costa Rican football player
 César Hernández (born 1990), Venezuelan professional baseball second baseman
 Dani Hernández, Venezuelan footballer
 Daniel Hernández, Mexican-American football player
 Darwinzon Hernández (born 1996), Venezuelan professional baseball pitcher
 David Hernandez, American baseball player
 Dewan Hernandez (born 1996), American basketball player
 Diory Hernández, Dominican baseball player
 Édgar Hernández (born 1977), Mexican race walker
 Elier Hernández (born 1994), Dominican baseball player
 Elieser Hernández (born 1995), Venezuelan baseball player
 Emilio Hernández, Chilean football player
 Enrique Hernández (born 1991), Puerto Rican baseball player
 Félix Hernández (born 1986), Venezuelan baseball player
 Francisco Hernández, Costa Rican football player
 Fredy Hernández, Colombian race walker
 Gabriel Hernández, Dominican boxer
 Giovanni Hernández, Colombian football player
 Guadalupe Bautista Hernández (born 1988), Mexican professional boxer
 Hailey Hernandez, American olympic diver 
 Henry Hernández, Salvadoran football player
 Hugo Hernández, Mexican professional boxer
 Humberto Hernández, Colombian road cyclist 
 Israel Hernández, Cuban judo athlete
 Jairo Hernández, Colombian cyclist
 James Chico Hernandez, American wrestler
 Jason Hernandez, Puerto Rican-American soccer player
 Javier Hernández nicknamed "Chicharito", Mexican soccer player
 Joaquín Hernández, Mexican football player
 Joe Hernandez, American football player
 Jonathan Hernández (born 1996), Dominican-American baseball player
 Jonay Hernández, Venezuelan football player
 José Hernández (born 1969), Puerto Rican baseball coach
 José Alberto Hernández, Mexican football player
 Jose María Gutiérrez Hernández, Spanish football player (commonly known as Guti)
 Juan Camilo Hernández, nicknamed "Cucho", Colombian football player
 Juan Martín Hernández, Argentine rugby player
 Juan Hernández Ramírez, Mexican football player
 Juan Hernández Sierra, Cuban boxer
 Juan Bautista Hernández Pérez, Cuban boxer
 Keith Hernandez (born 1953), American baseball player
 Kike Hernandez (born 1991), Puerto Rican baseball player
 Laurie Hernandez (born 2000), American gymnast
 Liván Hernández (born 1975), Cuban baseball player
 Lucas Hernandez, French professional footballer
 Luis Hernández, Mexican football player
 Luis Hernández, Mexican long-distance runner
 Luis Hernández, Mexican figure skater
 Luis Hernández, Venezuelan baseball player
 Luis Daniel Hernández, Peruvian footballer
 Luis Miguel Hernández, Salvadoran footballer
 Luis Omar Hernández, Mexican football player
 Manuel Hernández, Spanish motorbike rider
 Manuel Hernandez, Spanish-American football player
 Miguel Hernández, Mexican soccer player 
 María de la Paz Hernández, Argentine field hockey player
 Marcos Hernández, Cuban freestyle swimmer
 Matt Hernandez (born 1961), American football player
 Nicolás Hernández, Argentine football player
 Noé Hernández (1978–2013), Mexican race walker
 Orlando Hernández (born 1965), Cuban baseball player
 Óscar Hernández, Spanish tennis player
 Pablo Hernández Domínguez, Spanish football player
 Patricio Hernández (born 1956), Argentine football player and coach
 Pedro Hernández, Dominican baseball player
 Pedro Hernández, Cuban fencer
 Pedro Hernández, Mexican football player
 Pedro Hernández Martínez, Spanish football player
 Pepu Hernández (born 1958), Spanish basketball coach
 Rafael Tobías Hernández Alvarado, Venezuelan baseball player
 Ramón Hernández, Puerto Rican beach volleyball player
 Ramon Hernández, Venezuelan baseball player
 Roberto Hernández (1967–2021), Cuban sprinter
 Roberto Hernández (born 1964), Puerto Rican baseball player
 Román Hernández Onna (1949–2021), Cuban chess grandmaster
 Ronaldo Hernández, Colombian baseball player
 Rudy Hernández, Dominican baseball player
 Rudy Hernández, Mexican baseball player
 Runelvys Hernández, Dominican baseball player
 Sebastián Hernández, Colombian football player
 Sergio Hernández, Spanish race car driver
 Sergio Hernández, Argentine basketball coach
 Teoscar Hernández (born 1992), Dominican baseball player
 Theo Hernandez, French professional footballer
 Toby Hernández, Venezuelan baseball player
 Tomás Hernández (1930–1982), Spanish footballer
 Víctor Hugo Hernández, Mexican football player
 Will Hernandez, American football player
 Willie Hernández, Puerto Rican baseball player
 Xavi Hernández, Spanish football player
 Yadiel Hernández (born 1987), Cuban baseball player
 Yampier Hernández, Cuban boxer
 Yermi Hernández, Honduran football player
 Yoan Pablo Hernández, Cuban boxer
 Yoandry Hernández, Cuban weightlifter
 Yonny Hernández (born 1998), Venezuelan baseball player

Writers
 Alonso Hernández del Portillo (1543–1624), Spanish chronicler
 Amado V. Hernandez (1903–1970), Filipino writer and labor leader
 Anabel Hernández (born 1972), Mexican journalist
 Carol Hernandez, American journalist
 Consuelo Hernández (born 1952), Colombian/American poet and literary critic
 Ernesto Hernández Busto (born 1968), Cuban writer
 Felisberto Hernández (1902–1964), Uruguayan writer
 Gilbert Hernandez (born 1957), American cartoonist (part of Los Bros Hernandez)
Iliana Hernández (born 1973), Cuban journalist
 Jaime Hernandez (born 1959), American cartoonist (part of Los Bros Hernandez)
 Javier Hernandez (born 1966), American comic book writer
 José Hernández (1834–1886), Argentine poet, journalist, and politician
 Macarena Hernandez, American journalist and academic
 Mario Hernandez (born 1953), American writer and cartoonist (part of Los Bros Hernandez)
 Miguel Hernández (1910–1942), Spanish poet and playwright 
 Natalio Hernández (born 1947), Mexican Nahua poet
 Normando Hernández González (born 1969), Cuban writer and journalist
 Raúl Hernández Garrido (born 1964), Spanish playwright
 Tim Z. Hernandez (born 1974), American writer and poet
 Victor Hernández Cruz (born 1948), Puerto Rican poet
 Von Hernandez, Filipino literature professor and environmentalist

Other
 Claudia Hernández, Peruvian beauty queen and model
Dena G. Hernandez, neurogeneticist
 Diego E. Hernández (1934–2017) United States admiral
Dolores Jiménez Hernández (born 1955), Mexican diplomat 
 Edward Niño Hernández, Colombian man, formerly the world's shortest living man 
 Esequiel Hernández Jr, Mexican-American high school student accidentally killed by U.S. military
 Francisco Hernández de Córdoba (died 1517), Spanish conquistador, explorer of Yucatán
 Francisco Hernández de Córdoba (1475?–1526), Spanish conquistador, founder of Nicaragua
 Francisco Hernández de Toledo (1514–1587), Spanish naturalist and physician
 Gilberto Hernández Guerrero (born 1970), Mexican chess player
 Gilmer Hernandez, American former border officer
 Guillermo Hernández-Cartaya, Cuban-American banker and tax evader
 Hernandez brothers, American graphic artists
 Hil Hernández, Chilean beauty queen
 Humberto Hernandez Jr., Cuban-American attorney and government official
 Israel Hernandez, American government official
 Isaac Hernández, Mexican ballet dancer
 José Gregorio Hernández (1864–1919), Venezuelan physician
 José M. Hernández (born 1962), American engineer and former astronaut
 Juan Hernández Saravia, Republican officer during the Spanish Civil War
 María Julia Hernández (1939–2007), Salvadoran human rights activist
 Nouria Hernandez (born 1957), Swiss biologist and rector of the University of Lausanne
 Pedro Hernández de Córdova, Spanish soldier
 Rosario Hernández Diéguez (1916-1936), Spanish Galician newspaper hawker and trade unionist
 Valerie Hernandez, Puerto Rican beauty pageant winner [[Miss International 2014

Places

 Garcia Hernandez, town in Bohol province of the Philippines
 Hernandez Houses, New York
 Hernandez, New Mexico
 Hernandez Reservoir, California
 Hernández–Capron Trail, Florida
 Maria Hernandez Park, New York
 Rafael Hernández Airport, Puerto Rico

Legal cases

 Hernandez v. Texas (1954 in the Supreme Court of the United States, on civil rights for Mexican Americans)
 People v. Hernandez (1956 in the Supreme Court of the Philippines, on the crime of rebellion)
 United States v. Montoya De Hernandez (1985 in the Supreme Court of the United States, on detention and border searches relating to drug smuggling)
 Hernandez v. Commissioner (1989 in the Supreme Court of the United States, on whether fees for training programs operated by charities can be deducted as charitable contributions)
 Hernandez v. New York (1991 in the Supreme Court of the United States, on the removal of jurors from cases on the basis of their ability to understand Spanish testimony)
 Hernandez v. Robles (2006 in the New York Court of Appeals, on whether the prohibition of same-sex marriage is a violation of civil rights)
 Hernandez v. Mesa (2017 in the U.S. Supreme Court, argued again in 2019, on civil liability for a border patrol agent acting in a border zone)

Sciences
 19079 Hernández, a main belt asteroid

Other
 Hernández-Camacho's night monkey, South American primate

See also 

 Elizabeth Hernandez (disambiguation)
 Fernández
 Hernandes
 Fernandes

References

Spanish-language surnames
Surnames of Spanish origin
Patronymic surnames
Surnames from given names
Surnames of Honduran origin
Surnames of Salvadoran origin
Surnames of Guatemalan origin
Surnames of Colombian origin